Dmitry Sergeyevich Chernukhin (born 17 November 1988) is a Russian professional footballer.

Club career
He made his Russian Football National League debut for FC Tosno on 6 July 2014 in a game against FC Gazovik Orenburg.

External links
 

1988 births
Footballers from Moscow
Living people
Russian footballers
Association football midfielders
FC Tosno players
FC Dynamo Saint Petersburg players
Russian expatriate footballers
Expatriate footballers in Estonia
JK Narva Trans players
Meistriliiga players
FC Torpedo Vladimir players
FC Sportakademklub Moscow players
Russian expatriate sportspeople in Estonia